Joe William Anderson (born 13 October 1989) is an English retired semi-professional footballer, who usually played as a left-back.

Career

Fulham
Born in Stepney, London, Anderson began his career as a youth player at Fulham before he was promoted to the reserve team and was loaned out to Woking during the second half of the 2008–09 season. After signing his first professional contract, he quickly earned a first team place.

Anderson made his first team debut for Fulham on 23 September 2009 in a 2–1 League Cup defeat at the City of Manchester Stadium against Manchester City, coming on as a replacement for Zoltán Gera in extra time.

Anderson was five times an unused substitute for Fulham's Europa League group matches against Amkar Perm, CSKA Sofia, Basel and Roma (home and away).

Lincoln City
On 31 December it was announced that Anderson would be joining Lincoln City on a permanent deal with the Imps that will run until the summer of 2011. The deal was officially completed when the transfer window reopened on 1 January 2010.

On 9 February 2011, it was announced that Anderson had been training with Grimsby Town ahead of a potential loan move, however Grimsby did not follow there interest in the player and he returned to Sincil Bank after spending a week with The Mariners.

In May 2011 he was not offered a new contract after a mass clear out of players following the club's relegation from the Football League.

Hornchurch
In August 2011, he joined AFC Hornchurch, debuting in the club's Isthmian League Premier Division 2–1 defeat at Lowestoft Town on 29 August 2011. Anderson was voted Hornchurch's 2011–12 player of the season.

Billericay Town
In September 2012, Anderson signed for Billericay Town. After making a total of 23 appearances in all competitions, he left the club in February 2013.

Cambridge United
Shortly after leaving Billericay, Anderson joined Cambridge United on a short-term deal. He made his debut on 12 February 2013, in a 3–0 home defeat to Alfreton Town. He went on to make four further appearances before leaving the club at the end of the season.

Bromley
Anderson joined Conference South side Bromley on 5 June 2013. He scored his first goal for the club in a 4–1 home win over Dorchester Town on 2 November 2013. He then scored a free-kick in Bromley's next match, a 5–0 win over Chelmsford City. Anderson's next goal came on 10 December, in a 2–0 away win over Dover Athletic. In December 2013, Anderson was named Conference South player of the month. Manager Mark Goldberg won the Manager of the month award. His final goal of the league season came in a 2–1 away win over Gosport Borough on 26 April. Having spent four seasons at the club, Anderson departed Bromley towards the end of the 2016–17 season.

Maidstone United
On 27 May 2017, Anderson joined Maidstone United on a permanent deal. On 4 August Anderson made his full debut in the 1–1 draw with newly promoted Maidenhead United playing the full 90 minutes. At the end of the 2017–18 season Anderson was released by Maidstone having made more than 50 appearances for The Stones over the course of the season.

Chelmsford City
On 14 May 2018, Anderson signed for Chelmsford City. On 11 August 2018, Anderson scored his first goal for the club, scoring the opener in a 6–0 win against Hungerford Town. On 9 May 2019, Anderson was released by Chelmsford.

Welling United
On 17 June 2019, Welling United announced that they had signed Anderson.

Margate
On 20 May 2022, Anderson announced his retirement from football.

Career statistics

References

External links

Lincoln City F.C. Official Archive Profile

1989 births
Living people
Footballers from Stepney
English footballers
Association football fullbacks
Fulham F.C. players
Woking F.C. players
Lincoln City F.C. players
Hornchurch F.C. players
Billericay Town F.C. players
Cambridge United F.C. players
Bromley F.C. players
Maidstone United F.C. players
Chelmsford City F.C. players
Welling United F.C. players
Margate F.C. players
National League (English football) players
English Football League players